Desafinado is an album by American jazz saxophonist Coleman Hawkins featuring performances recorded in 1962 for the Impulse! label.

Reception
Harvey Pekar's January 17, 1963 review for Down Beat magazine stated "There have been some gimmicky bossa nova albums issued recently, but this one features music of high and enduring quality."

The Allmusic review by Michael G. Nastos awarded the album 4 stars stating "The simplified style of this album overall perfectly suited the amiable, good-natured, and laid-back Hawkins."

Track listing
 "Desafinado" (Antonio Carlos Jobim, Newton Mendonça) — 5:48
 "I'm Looking Over a Four Leaf Clover (Jazz Samba)" (Mort Dixon, Harry M. Woods) — 2:52
 "Samba Para Bean" (Manny Albam) — 5:28
 "I Remember You" (Johnny Mercer, Victor Schertzinger) — 3:58
 "One Note Samba" (Jobim, Mendonça) — 5:59
 "O Pato (The Duck)" (Jayme Silva, Neuza Teixeira) — 4:10
 "Un Abraco No Bonfa (An Embrace to Bonfa)" (João Gilberto) — 4:51
 "Stumpy Bossa Nova" (Coleman Hawkins) — 2:30

Recorded on September 12, 1962 (#2-5) and 17, 1962 (#1, 6-8).

Personnel

Coleman Hawkins — tenor saxophone
Howard Collins, Barry Galbraith — guitar
Major Holley — bass
Eddie Locke — drums, percussion
Tommy Flanagan — claves
Willie Rodriguez — percussion
Manny Albam — arranger

References

Impulse! Records albums
Coleman Hawkins albums
1962 albums
Albums recorded at Van Gelder Studio
Albums arranged by Manny Albam